The 1943 All-American Girls Professional Baseball League season marked the inaugural season of the circuit. Since the only organized ball for women in the country was softball, the league created a hybrid game which included both softball and baseball.

The league underwent a name change during the season; it began as the All-American Girls Softball League., but midway through the 1943 season, the name was changed to the All-American Girls Baseball League (AAGBBL).

The AAGPBL began with a 12-inch softball but incorporated baseball rules. The new league started with four teams, the Kenosha Comets, Racine Belles, Rockford Peaches and South Bend Blue Sox. The teams competed through a 108-game schedule, while the first Scholarship Series faced first-half winner Racine against Kenosha, second-half champ, in a Best of Five Series.

The strong pitching led to low batting averages, as the league hit a collective .230 average with Racine topping the chart (.246). Just one player, Rockford's Gladys Davis, reached the .300 mark. Only 72 home runs were batted for the four teams. Ten of these homers came from the bat of Eleanor Dapkus with Racine.

Kenosha pitcher Helen Nicol won the Triple Crown with 31 wins, 220 strikeouts and a 1.81 earned run average, and also led the league in winning percentage (.795), consecutive wins (13), complete games (33), shutouts (8) and innings pitched (348). The best individual pitching performance on the year came from Rockford's Olive Little, who hurled the first no-hitter in league history.

In the final series, Racine blanked Kenosha in three games to win the first title of the league. Irene Hickson led the Belles with a .417 average, while pitchers Mary Nesbitt, Joanne Winter and Helen Nicol were credited with a win a piece.

The AAGPBL drew 176,000 fans during its inaugural season, which assured the league would continue the following year.

Standings

First half

Second half

Composite records

Postseason

Individual statistics

Batting

Pitching

All-time individual records
Josephine D'Angelo (SB) – Fewest strikeouts in a season: three times in 358 at bats
Shirley Jameson (KEN) – Most consecutive games stealing a base: 18 (June 14–23)
Margaret Stefani (SB) – Most consecutive games without striking out: 57 (June 3 – August 22)
Mildred Warwick (ROC) – Most consecutive games batting a hit: 13 (June 20–27)
Dorothy Wind (RAC) –  Most  hits batted in a single game: six (August 28)

All-Star Game

See also
1943 Major League Baseball season

Sources

External links
AAGPBL Official Website
AAGPBL League history
AAGPBL Rules of play
AAGPBL Records
Baseball Historian files
The Diamond Angle profiles and interviews
SABR Projects – Jim Sargent articles
YouTube videos

All-American Girls Professional Baseball League seasons
1940s in women's baseball
All-American Girls Professional Baseball League season
All